Guerres mondiales et conflits contemporains (French, literally "World Wars and Contemporary Conflicts") is a quarterly peer-reviewed academic journal covering the history of modern conflicts, until 1987 with a particular focus on World War II. It is published by the Presses Universitaires de France.

The journal was established in 1949 as the Cahiers d'histoire de la guerre. In 1950 it was renamed as Revue d'histoire de la Deuxième Guerre mondiale and in 1982 as Revue d'histoire de la Deuxième Guerre mondiale et des conflits contemporains, before obtaining its current title in 1987. The founding editor-in-chief was Henri Michel. Currently, the editor-in-chief is Chantal Metzger.

Abstracting and indexing
The journal is abstracted and indexed in:
Arts & Humanities Citation Index
Current Contents/Arts & Humanities
FRANCIS
International Bibliography of the Social Sciences
Scopus

References

External links

Quarterly journals
French-language journals
History journals
1949 establishments in France
Publications established in 1949
Historiography of World War II